Trevis Turner (born May 2, 1987) is an American football offensive lineman who is currently a free agent. He played college football for Abilene Christian University.

College career

Turner originally signed with Colorado State University out of high school, but choose not to enroll at the school and attended Trinity Valley Community College. Turner started for one season with the Cardinals, before transferring to Northeastern State University, where he didn't not play for the RiverHawks. Prior to the 2008 season, Turner transferred to Abilene Christian University. As a sophomore in 2008, Turner was named Second Team All-Lone Star Conference South Division as an offensive tackle. As a senior in 2010, Turner was named First Team All-LSC and was named a finalist for the Gene Upshaw Award. He was also named a Division II All-American

Professional career

Pittsburgh Steelers
Turner signed as an undrafted free agent with the Pittsburgh Steelers of the National Football League in 2011. Turner spent the entire season as a member of the Steelers practice squad. Turner was released in May 2012, after it was announced that he would be suspended the first four games of the 2012 season.

Nebraska Danger
On December 9, 2013, Turner signed with the Nebraska Danger of the Indoor Football League, where he then signed and played in the Canadian Football League (CFL) for the Edmonton Eskimos for a season . In 2015, Turner was named a First Team All-IFL selection.

Return to Orlando
On February 8, 2014, Turner was traded back to Orlando with Bernard Morris, Matt Marcorelle in exchange for Aaron Garcia. However, Turner had refused to report the entire 2014 season, and remained with the Danger.

Billings Wolves
On March 23, 2016, Turner signed with the Billings Wolves. He was released on April 22, 2016.

Return to Nebraska Danger
On May 19, 2016, Turner returned to the Nebraska Danger.

Texas Revolution
Tuner signed with the Texas Revolution for the 2017 season. He was released on February 20, 2017.

Bloomington Edge
On June 1, 2017, Turner signed with the Bloomington Edge.

References

External links
Abilene Christian bio

1987 births
Living people
American football offensive linemen
Trinity Valley Cardinals football players
Abilene Christian Wildcats football players
Pittsburgh Steelers players
Orlando Predators players
Jacksonville Sharks players
Nebraska Danger players
Players of American football from Texas
Billings Wolves players
Texas Revolution players
Bloomington Edge players